Choi Yeong-joon (born August 16, 1965) is a retired South Korean footballer.

He graduated in Yonsei University, and played for Lucky-Goldstar Hwangso. He was the first captain of Lucky-Goldstar Hwangso.

Honours

Player
Lucky-Goldstar Hwangso
 K-League Winners (1) : 1990

Ulsan Hyundai Horangi
 K-League Winners (1) : 1996

Individual
 K-League Best XI (1) : 1990

External links
 
 

K League 1 players
FC Seoul players
Ulsan Hyundai FC players
South Korean footballers
Busan IPark managers
1965 births
Living people

Association football midfielders